Telefone (Portuguese "telephone") may refer to:

 Telefone (mixtape), by Noname
 "Telefone (Long Distance Love Affair)", song by Sheena Easton
 The Telefones, American music group
 José de Almeida Neto, Brazilian footballer known as Telefone